Buster Bronco may refer to:

Buster Bronco (Boise State), the mascot of Boise State University
Buster Bronco (Western Michigan), the mascot of Western Michigan University